I Miss My Friend is the second studio album by American  country music singer Darryl Worley released on July 16, 2002. The album produced Worley's first number one single on the Hot Country Songs charts in its title track; "Family Tree" was also a Top 30 hit for him on the same chart.  "Tennessee River Run" was later reprised on Worley's first compilation album Have You Forgotten?, from which it was released as that album's second single.

"POW 369" was also recorded by Doug Stone on his 2002 album The Long Way, from which it was released as a single.

Track listing

Personnel
Eddie Bayers- drums
Larry Beaird- acoustic guitar
Mike Brignardello- bass guitar
Melodie Crittenden- background vocals
Eric Darken- percussion
C.A. Dreyer- finger snaps
Paul Franklin- dobro, steel guitar
Kevin "Swine" Grantt- bass guitar
Randy Hardison- finger snaps, background vocals
Aubrey Haynie- fiddle, mandolin
Wes Hightower- vocal ad-libs, background vocals
Rob Ickes- dobro
Kirk "Jelly Roll" Johnson- harmonica
Brice Long- finger snaps, background vocals
Brent Mason- electric guitar
The Nashville String Machine- strings
Steve Nathan- organ, piano
Kimberly Perkins- finger snaps
Frank Rogers- finger snaps
Manny Rogers- laughing on "Family Tree"
Bryan Sutton- acoustic guitar, mandolin
Wynn Varble- finger snaps, background vocals
Biff Watson- acoustic guitar
Bergen White- conductor, string arrangements
Brian David Willis- percussion
Darryl Worley- finger snaps, lead vocals
Curtis Wright- background vocals

Charts

Weekly charts

Year-end charts

References

2002 albums
DreamWorks Records albums
Darryl Worley albums
Albums produced by Frank Rogers (record producer)
Albums produced by James Stroud